Marc Danzon was the European regional director for the World Health Organization from 2000 until 2010. Danzon, who is French, has a background working as a child psychiatrist. In February 2010, Zsuzsanna Jakab succeeded him.

References

Year of birth missing (living people)
Living people
World Health Organization officials